Ferenci is a village near Ozalj, Karlovac County, Croatia.

Location 
It is situated 20 km from Karlovac and 6 km northeast of Ozalj. It lies near the left bank of the river Kupa.

History 
Before the signing of the Treaty of Trianon, Ferenci belonged to the Jaska part of Zagreb County.

Historical population

References 

Populated places in Karlovac County